Five ships of the French Navy have carried the name Africaine:

List
 Africaine, a felucca (1664) 
 Africaine, the renamed , was a 44-gun frigate wrecked in 1822
  (1827–1833), was a balancelle or bateau purchased at Toulon in 1827, decommissioned in 1833, and struck in 1835.
  (1839–72), a 40-gun frigate that also served as a transport, convict transport, and service craft. She was struck from the rolls in 1867 while serving as a storage hulk at Martinique. She was broken up in 1872.

Other
 Africaine, a French 20-gun ship whose seizure by a British privateer in 1804 off Charleston gave rise to an important court case that helped define the extent of U.S. territorial waters.

See also
  - different spelling
 , two ships of the Royal Navy

Citations and references
Citations

References
 

French Navy ship names